Sidchrome is an Australian brand of mechanics' tools. It is a subsidiary of Stanley Black & Decker.

History
The brand emerged when Royston Siddons' Siddons Drop Forgings Pty Ltd turned to tool making to fill post war shortages after World War II. Original production of Sidchrome tools in Australia was in the area of Brunswick, in the city of Melbourne, Victoria.

Sidchrome was acquired by The Stanley Works (now Stanley Black & Decker) in 1991.
Sidchrome closed the plant and ended all local manufacturing in 1996 and started to move all tool manufacturing to Taiwan, whilst sourcing various items from Proto in the USA (marked as Proto on items) due to supply of left-over Australian-made tools being sold out until all manufacturing was fully established in Taiwan.

Racing 
Sidchrome sponsored several Australian and New Zealand racing drivers in the 1970s, notably New Zealand and Australian saloon champion Jim Richards.

Present 
Sidchrome is still a top selling automotive tool brand in Australia and New Zealand and since 2007, the brand sponsors the Most Improved Award in Australia's V8 Supercar Championship Series.

References

External links

 Founder Royston Siddon's entry at Australian Dictionary of Biography Online
 Sidchrome Mustang page

Automotive tool manufacturers
Tool manufacturing companies of Australia
Australian brands
Stanley Black & Decker brands
1990 mergers and acquisitions
Manufacturing companies based in Melbourne